Gabriel Wing-Chuen Ho-Garcia (born May 19, 1993) is a Canadian male field hockey player, who played for the Canada national field hockey team at the 2015 Pan American Games and won a silver medal. He was also named to the 2015 Pan-American Elite Team, one of the top 16 players in the Americas.

Career
In 2016, he was named to Canada's Olympic team, where the team finished in 11th place. In June 2021, Ho-Garcia was named to Canada's 2020 Summer Olympics team.

References

External links
Gabriel Ho-Garcia at Field Hockey Canada

1993 births
Living people
Field hockey people from British Columbia
Canadian male field hockey players
Male field hockey midfielders
Male field hockey forwards
Field hockey players at the 2014 Commonwealth Games
Field hockey players at the 2015 Pan American Games
Field hockey players at the 2016 Summer Olympics
Field hockey players at the 2020 Summer Olympics
2018 Men's Hockey World Cup players
Commonwealth Games competitors for Canada
Pan American Games silver medalists for Canada
Sportspeople from Burnaby
Canadian sportspeople of Chinese descent
Canadian people of Taiwanese descent
Canadian people of Spanish descent
Olympic field hockey players of Canada
Pan American Games medalists in field hockey
HTC Uhlenhorst Mülheim players
Mannheimer HC players
Club de Campo Villa de Madrid players
Medalists at the 2015 Pan American Games